James Michael Hanley (July 19, 1920 – October 16, 2003) was an American businessman, World War II veteran, and politician who represented New York in the House of Representatives for eight terms from 1965 to 1981.

Biography
James M. Hanley was born in Syracuse, New York, on July 19, 1920.  He attended local schools and graduated from St. Lucy's Academy in 1938.  He was a funeral director, and the owner and operator of the Callahan-Hanley-Mooney Funeral Home.

World War II 
Hanley enlisted for World War II and served in the United States Army from 1942 to 1946.

Tenure in Congress 
In 1964 he was a successful Democratic candidate for a Syracuse-based congressional district, the first Democrat to hold this seat since 1915.  He served eight terms, 1965 to 1981, and was Chairman of the Committee on Post Office and Civil Service in his final term.  During his Congressional career, Hanley was known as a liberal, and supported the Great Society program of Lyndon B. Johnson, expansion of Medicare and Head Start, and the Equal Rights Amendment.

Later career and death 
Hanley did not run for reelection in 1980; since then, no other Democrat has represented Syracuse in Congress for two consecutive terms.  He worked as a government relations consultant in the Washington, D.C. area until 1990, afterwards retiring to upstate New York.

He died in Geddes, New York, on October 16, 2003, and was buried at the Onondaga County Veterans Memorial Cemetery.

Legacy 
The federal building in Syracuse is named for him.

References

External links

James M. Hanley at Political Graveyard

1920 births
2003 deaths
United States Army personnel of World War II
American people of Irish descent
American funeral directors
Politicians from Syracuse, New York
Democratic Party members of the United States House of Representatives from New York (state)
20th-century American politicians